Langkampfen is a municipality in the middle of the Austrian state of Tyrol between Kufstein (8 km southwest below) and Wörgl (8 km north above). The name comes from the Latin Longus campus, which means the long field.

References

External links
 Official website

Cities and towns in Kufstein District